Riverside Farm, also known as the Pierce-Randolph Farm, is a historic farmhouse in Walter Hill, Tennessee, U.S..

History
The main house was built circa 1831 for Alfred Pierce, a corn and cotton farmer who owned 23 slaves by 1860. Several more buildings were erected on the farm.

When it was purchased by Beverly Randolph, Jr. in 1871, several of Pierce's former slaves had become tenant farmers. Randolph turned the property into a dairy farm.

By the early 2000s, his descendant, Beverly Randolph Jones, had turned it into a hay farm.

Architectural significance
The main house was designed as an I-house in the Greek Revival architectural style. It has been listed on the National Register of Historic Places since December 12, 2006.

References

Houses on the National Register of Historic Places in Tennessee
Greek Revival architecture in Tennessee
Houses completed in 1831
Buildings and structures in Rutherford County, Tennessee
I-houses in Tennessee